The music of Himachal Pradesh  includes many kinds of folk songs from the area, many of which are sung without accompaniment.

Styles
 is a type of song that celebrates extramarital romance.The word means lover .  It is popular in Mahasu and Sirmaur, and is accompanied by a female dance called .

Laman songs from Kullu Valley are another type of love song. 

Saṃskāra songs are sung at festivals and celebrations by women of Himachal Pradesh. These songs are based on ragas, which are compositions of Indian classical music, as are the martial . 

 are religious songs, sung at the bride's house after a wedding and by women at the home of an unmarried girl. 

Musical instruments

Percussion

Winds

Strings

Singers
Mohit Chauhan's 'morni', Karnail Rana's various folk songs, Dheeraj's love songs and Thakur Das Rathi's 'Naatis' has given great contribution to the music of Himachal Pradesh. New initiatives like Mountain Music Project and Laman are giving Himachali folk a contemporary sound.

Modern Himachali Music

References

 
Himachal